Pecos County is a county located in the U.S. state of Texas. As of the 2020 census, its population was 15,193. The county seat is Fort Stockton. The county was created in 1871 and organized in 1875. It is named for the Pecos River. It is one of the nine counties that comprise the Trans-Pecos region of West Texas.

History

Native Americans

Archeological digs at Squawteat Peak uncovered prehistoric hunter-gatherer artifacts. Fourteen clusters of stones interpreted as wickiup and tipi rings indicate human habitation. A ring midden in the camp provided a radiocarbon date of 1300 AD. Archeological finds along Tunas Creek include a burial site, pictographs, and artifacts; one is a possible modified Langtry projectile point (2,000 BC to 700–800 AD).

Early routes

The Comanche Trail crossed Pecos County near Horsehead Crossing and through Comanche Springs.
The Chihuahua Trail connecting Mexico's state of Chihuahua with Santa Fe, New Mexico, brought travelers through the area by Comanche Springs about 1840.

A United States Army outpost, Fort Stockton, was established in 1858 at Comanche Springs to guard the San Antonio-El Paso Mail. That same year, the Butterfield Overland Mail began service to the army post.

County established and growth

The town of Fort Stockton began near the Fort Stockton army post at Comanche Springs as St. Gaul, Texas, but was renamed Fort Stockton in 1880. Pecos County was established by the Texas Legislature in 1871 originally out of Presidio County. In 1871, Pecos County was organized and St. Gaul was named the county seat. About 1,100 people were living in the county that year. By 1900, the area's economy had become almost completely dominated by cattle and sheep ranching, though plots of wheat, rye, corn, and oats were grown. Around 1900, a small settlement known as Sheffield sprang up in eastern Pecos County on land owned by Will Sheffield; it served as a supply point for the surrounding ranches. In 1913, construction of the Kansas City, Mexico and Orient Railway across Pecos County caused a boom in land speculation and community growth, as did irrigation projects along the Pecos River. The town of Girvin, named for rancher John H. Girvin, grew around a train stop on the Kansas City, Mexico and Orient Railway that served as a cattle-shipping point. Construction of Texas State Highway 290 linking Fort Stockton to Big Bend National Park gave a boost to tourism. In the 1980s, the economy of Pecos County continued to be based on farming, ranching, oil and gas production, and tourism. The Yates Oil Field in Crockett County, Texas, and Pecos County in 1927 resulted in a financial boom period for the county. Towns such as Red Barn, Iraan (combination of the names Ira and Ann Yates), and Bakersfield rose up in response to oil-related employment opportunities. The population of the county more than doubled during the 1920s. Oil production helped to stabilize the local economy.

Alley Oop and Paisano Pete

The town of Iraan, Texas, prides itself on being the birthplace of cartoon caveman Alley Oop, when creator V.T. Hamlin worked in the oilfields.  Although first published in the Des Moines Register in 1932, Hamlin claimed to have originated the idea while he watched dinosaur bones being dug up by oil equipment. Visitors to Iraan can visit the Alley Oop Museum found on Alley Oop Lane.  Fort Stockton pays tribute to the agile roadrunner with its Paisano Pete the Roadrunner statue.

Geography
It is the second-largest county by area in Texas.

Yates Oil Field
Pecos County is home to one of the largest oil fields in the United States, the Yates Oil Field, which is in the extreme eastern part of the county, along the Pecos River. The field covers about  near the town of Iraan. Discovered in 1926, it has produced over a billion barrels of oil, and most industry estimates give it more than another billion in recoverable reserves. The Yates Oil Field was one of the first giant fields to be found in the Permian Basin.

Major highways 
  Interstate 10
  U.S. Highway 67
  U.S. Highway 190
  U.S. Highway 285
  U.S. Highway 385
  State Highway 18
  State Highway 290
  State Highway 349

Adjacent counties 
 Ward County (north)
 Crane County (north)
 Crockett County (east)
 Terrell County (south)
 Brewster County (south)
 Jeff Davis County (west and south)
 Reeves County (northwest)

Demographics 

As of the 2020 United States census, there were 15,193 people, 4,868 households, and 3,334 families residing in the county. As of the 2010 United States census, 15,507 were people living in the county; 79.4% were White, 3.7% Black or African American, 0.8% Native American, 0.5% Asian, 13.5% of some other race, and 2.1% of two or more races. About 67.3% were Hispanic or Latino (of any race).

Education
Public education in Pecos County is provided by three school districts: Buena Vista, Fort Stockton, and Iraan-Sheffield Independent School Districts.

Williams Regional Technical Training Center
Pecos County is home to the Midland College/Williams Regional Technical Training Center, located alongside Interstate Highway 10, in Fort Stockton. The center was built in 1996 through a joint effort by Midland College, and by leaders of Fort Stockton education, business, and government as a means to enhance higher education and workforce development in this part of West Texas. Fort Stockton and Pecos County are part of the Midland College service area. After just four years, the facility, named in honor of Fort Stockton native and center donor Clayton Williams Jr. was doubled in size through fundraising and program development.

Communities

Cities
 Fort Stockton (county seat)
 Iraan

Census-designated places
 Coyanosa
 Imperial

Unincorporated areas 
 Bakersfield
 Girvin
 Sheffield

Notable people
Oilman and rancher Clayton W. Williams Sr. served for 16 years as a Pecos county commissioner. His father, attorney Oscar Waldo Williams, earlier served a decade as Pecos county judge. Clayton Williams Jr. the 1990 Republican gubernatorial nominee, was reared in Fort Stockton.

Politics

See also

 List of museums in West Texas
 National Register of Historic Places listings in Pecos County, Texas
 Recorded Texas Historic Landmarks in Pecos County

References

External links 
 Pecos County government's website
 
 Midland College/Williams Regional Technical Center (WRTTC)

 
1875 establishments in Texas
Trans-Pecos
Populated places established in 1875